Adriaan Wildschutt (born 3 May 1998) is a South African long-distance runner, who competes professionally for the Hoka NAZ Elite team. 

He previously ran collegiately for Coastal Carolina University before transferring to Florida State for his final two years of college. 

In March 2021, Wildschutt finished second at the 2020 NCAA Division I Cross Country Championships. 

In February 2022, he ran an indoor 5000 metres in 13:09.30, setting a South African national record. He competed in the 5000 metres at the 2022 World Athletics Indoor Championships. He also competed in the 10,000 metres at the 2022 Commonwealth Games, placing 5th.

References

1998 births
Living people
South African male long-distance runners
Florida State Seminoles men's cross country runners
Florida State Seminoles men's track and field athletes
Athletes (track and field) at the 2022 Commonwealth Games
Commonwealth Games competitors for South Africa
World Athletics Championships athletes for South Africa